Naranarayana, also rendered Nara-Narayana, is a Hindu duo of sage-brothers. Generally regarded to be the partial-incarnation (aṃśa-avatara) of the preserver deity, Vishnu, on earth, Nara-Narayana are described to be the sons of Dharma and Ahimsa. 

The Hindu scripture Mahabharata identifies the prince Arjuna with Nara, and the deity Krishna with Narayana. The legend of Nara-Narayana is also told in the scripture Bhagavata Purana. Hindus believe that the pair dwells at Badrinath, where their most important temple stands.

Etymology

The name "Nara-Narayana" can be broken into two Sanskrit terms, Nara and Narayana. Nara means 'male being', and Narayana refers to the name of the deity.

Monier-Williams dictionary says Nara is "the primeval Man or eternal Spirit pervading the universe always associated with Narayana, "son of the primeval man". In epic poetry, they are the sons of Dharma by Murti or Ahimsa, and emanations of Vishnu, Arjuna being identified with Nara, and Krishna with Narayana.

Iconography

Nara-Narayana are depicted jointly or separately in images. When depicted separately, Nara is portrayed with two hands and wearing deer skin, while Narayana is shown on the right in the usual form of Vishnu. Nara is supposed to be depicted as fair-complexioned, while Narayana is to be portrayed as dark-complexioned.

Sometimes, both of them are depicted identical to each other. They are depicted four-armed and holding a mace, a discus, a conch, and a lotus, resembling Vishnu.

Legend

Birth 
According to D.C. Sircar, before their incarnations as Arjuna-Krishna, the duo were born as the sages Nara-Narayana, the latter being the son of Dharma. They travelled from the world of men to the world of Brahman and, with veneration from both the devas and the gandharvas, existed exclusively for the destruction of asuras. Indra is described to have been assisted by Nara and Narayana in his conflict with the asuras.   

According to the Vamana Purana, the twins were sons of dharma, the son of Brahma and his wife Murti (daughter of Daksha), or Ahimsa. They live at Badrika, performing severe austerities and meditation, for the welfare of the world and mankind. 

According to the Mahabharata, when answering Yudhishthira's question, Bhishma mentioned that during the beginning of the creation, the first-born had split himself into 4 parts i.e. sages Nara & Narayana along with the deities Hari and Krishna.

Birth of Urvashi
The Bhagavata Purana narrates Urvashi's birth from the sages Nara-Narayana. Once, the sages Nara-Narayana were meditating in the holy shrine of Badrinath situated in the Himalayas. Their penances and austerities alarmed the devas, and so Indra, the King of the devas, sent Kamadeva, Rati, Vasanta (spring), and various apsaras (nymphs) such as Menaka and Rambha to inspire them with erotic passion, and disturb their devotions. The sage Narayana took a flower and placed it on his thigh. Immediately, there sprung from it a beautiful nymph, whose charms far excelled those of the apsaras, and made them return to heaven, filled with shame and vexation. Narayana sent this nymph to Indra with them, and since she been produced from the thigh (Ūru in Sanskrit) of the sage, she was called Urvashi. Having sent back the apsaras, the divine sages continued to meditate.

Conflict with Shiva 
According to the Mahabharata, Shiva's trishula, after laying waste to Daksha's yajna, travelled to the Badarikāśrama, where it pierced the breast of Narayana, who had been engaged in a penance. By the force of the utterance of the sound 'Hum', produced by Narayana, the trident was subsequently ejected from his breast and returned to Shiva, who was then determined to slay the sages. Nara is stated to have plucked a blade of grass from the earth, which became an axe, and discharged it towards the destroyer deity. Shiva is described to have broken this axe. In Shaiva tradition, the sage Narayana performed great penances at the holy spot of Badarikāśrama, propitiating Shiva, and becoming invincible.

Badrinath 

According to the Bhagavata Purana, "There in Badrikashram (Badrinath) the Personality of Godhead (Vishnu), in his incarnation as the sages Nara and Narayana, had been undergoing great penance since time immemorial for the welfare of all living entities." (3.4.22)

In Badrinath Temple's sanctorum, to the far right side of the stone image of Badri-Vishala (or Badri-Narayana), are the images of Nara and Narayana. Also, the Nara and Narayana peaks tower over Badrinath.

Duel against Prahlada 

Prahlada, the king of the asuras, once commanded his forces to accompany him to the holy tirtha of Naimiṣa, where he hoped to see a vision of Vishnu. They went hunting along the banks of the Sarasvati river. Prahlada observed two ascetics with matted hair, bearing the bows of Sharanga and Ajagava. The asura king asked them why they held weapons while performing a penance, and the two ascetics responded that all those who held power were righteous in their conduct. One of the rishis assured the king that none in the three worlds could conquer them in a duel. Prahlada rose to the challenge. Nara fired arrows upon the king with his Ajagava, but the latter was able to defeat him with his own gold-plated arrows. Prahlada employed the divine Brahmastra against Nara's Narayanastra. Seeing them neutralised in a mid-air collision, Prahlada wielded his mace against Narayana. His mace broke, and Prahlada found himself growing helpless, and sought Vishnu's assistance. Vishnu told his devotee that the Nara-Narayana brothers were invincible, as they were the sons of Yama, and could only be conquered in devotion rather than combat. The king left the regency to Andhaka, and erected an ashrama to propitiate Nara-Narayana, and apologised for his folly.

Arjuna-Krishna 

Arjuna and Krishna are often referred to as Nara-Narayana in the Mahabharata, and are considered reincarnations of Nara and Narayana respectively, according to the Devi Bhagavata Purana.

According to Bhandarkar, the deities of Nara-Narayana must have been very popular at the time of the composition of the Mahabharata, since in the opening stanzas of various parvas (constituent books) of the epic, obeisance is made to these two devas. In Vana Parva (12. 46, 47), Krishna says to Arjuna, "O invincible one, you are Nara and I am Hari Narayana, and we, the sages Nara-Narayana, have come to this world at the proper time.." In the same Parva, chapter 40 (verse 1); Shiva says to Arjuna — "In former birth you were Nara and with Narayana as your companion, performed austerities for thousands of years at Badari".

The Mahabharata suggests that by saluting Krishna (the omniscient Narayana), his friend and the highest of all male beings Arjuna, Saraswati, and Vyasa, the orator, and destroying demonic possessions, and conquering the conscience, one should recite the epic Mahabharata.

Veneration
In the Swaminarayan sect, Nara and Narayana, are called Nara-Narayana Deva. They are believed to reside at Badrikashram and to be the prime controllers of the destiny of all beings, depending on their karma. Nara-Narayana Deva are believed to have manifested at Narayana Ghat on the banks of river Sabarmati at Ahmedabad. Therefore, their images were installed by Swaminarayan at the first Swaminarayan temple, Swaminarayan Mandir, Ahmedabad (India).

Members of this group interpret the events that took place at Badarikashram, the abode of Nara Narayana, that led to the incarnation of Swaminarayan. They believe that Narayana took birth as Swaminarayan due to a curse of sage Durvasa which he accepted at his own will. The curse led to Narayana taking the form of an avatar on Earth to destroy evil and establish ekantik-dharma, religion based on morality, knowledge, detachment, and devotion. This belief is exclusive to the Swaminarayan sect.

See also

 Krishna
 Arjuna

Vishnu
Narayana

Notes

References
 
 
 Swaminarayan Temple Cardiff - Murtis - NarNarayan Dev

Further reading

External links
 Nara Narayana

Hindu gods
Avatars of Vishnu
Forms of Krishna
Divine twins
Rishis
Swaminarayan Sampradaya